Contemporary Christian music

Michael W. Smith 2 is the second album by Christian recording artist Michael W. Smith. Released in February 1984, "I Am Sure" and "Hosanna" were released to Christian radio. Among the musicians who contributed to the recording, Dann Huff and Mike Brignardello went on to form the band Giant. Huff was also a founding member of the CCM band White Heart. The album would win him his first Grammy Award for Best Gospel Performance, Male in 1985.

Track listing

Personnel 
Adapted from AllMusic credits:
 Michael W. Smith – lead vocals, synthesizers, electric piano (1, 7, 8), backing vocals (2-5, 7, 8), vocoder (3, 4, 7, 9), acoustic piano (4)
 Shane Keister – additional synthesizers (5, 8, 9)
 Dann Huff – guitars (1-4, 6-10)
 Leland Sklar – bass (1, 6)
 Mike Brignardello – bass (2, 3, 4, 7-10), Minimoog (7)
 Mark Hammond – Roland TR-909 drum machine (1), Simmons drums (1, 6)
 Paul Leim – drums (2, 3, 4, 7-10), LinnDrum (2, 7, 9)
 Lenny Castro – percussion (1-4, 6-9)
 Gary Chapman – backing vocals (1, 8)
 Ron Downey – backing vocals (2, 3, 5, 10)
 David Durham – backing vocals (2, 5, 10)
 Chris Harris – backing vocals (3, 10)
 Gary Pigg – backing vocals (3, 10)
 Amy Grant – backing vocals (7, 8)
 Jackie Cusic – backing vocals (10)
 Teresa Ellis – backing vocals (10)
 Bridgett Evans – backing vocals (10)
 Jan Harris – backing vocals (10)
 Kim Smith – backing vocals (10)
 Dave Thornton – backing vocals (10)

Production 
 Michael W. Smith – producer
 Brown Bannister – vocal production 
 Michael Blanton – executive producer
 Dan Harrell – executive producer
 Jack Joseph Puig – engineer, mixing
 Jim Baird – additional engineering
 Don Cobb – additional engineering
 Steven Ford – additional engineering
 Stephen McAlister – additional engineering
 Mike Psanos – additional engineering
 The Bennett House (Franklin, Tennessee) – recording location
 Tree International Studio (Nashville, Tennessee) – recording location
 Bullet Recording (Nashville, Tennessee) – recording location
 Mama Jo's Recording Studio (North Hollywood, California) – recording location
 Doug Sax – mastering
 The Mastering Lab (Los Angeles, California) – mastering location
 Kent Hunter – artwork, design
 Mark Tucker – photography

Chart performance

References

Michael W. Smith albums
1984 albums
Reunion Records albums